Transitional Housing Participant Misconduct Act (THPMA) is the all type of programs those are designed to assist homeless people to live independently in permanent housing. THPMA has its components as meeting requirements from 30 days to 24 months. It shall provide comprehensive social service programs. Also it provides temporary housing with structured setting and rules participants need to comply with to remain in program.

There are Transitional Housing Program Operator (THP Operator) who are the government agencies or private nonprofit receiving of portions out of this program' funds. THP operator is allowed to file an abuse of misconduct of the program. Abuse is attacking, striking, battering, or sexually assaulting another program participant. Any abuse to the program employee or a neighbor of the program site are counted as an abuse, as well. Court order can be got by THP operator to follow the procedure as in "Temporary Restraining Orders" or "permanent orders".

The Transitional Housing Participant Misconduct Act (THPMA) gives the right to THP to circumvent the lengthier unlawful detainer process to legally remove a participant from a transitional housing program. Transitional housing operator is allowed to file restraining order which requires to stop the abuse or forbidding the misconduct. If the resident violates permanent injunction, operator can change the file to a removing the resident from the program.

Transitional housing programs has its own supportive services However, these services are used in negative ways by either tenants or residents. This act limits some of these protections where it allows for a less than full judicial review in order to terminate or getting an order in a transitional housing program. The act preserves certain rights of appeal (California Health and Safety Code §50580)

Sources 

THPMA, California Legal Information website

Homelessness and law
Government of California